Angela Dugalić (born 29 December 2001) is a Serbian basketball player for the UCLA Bruins. Internationally she represents the Serbian national team. 
She also holds American citizenship.

College career 
Dugalić had played her first season of college basketball in 2020–21 with the Oregon Ducks before transferring to the UCLA Bruins after that season. As of January 19, 2022, she has yet to play for the Bruins, having suffered a knee injury in October 2021 while the Bruins were on a trip to play in a preseason scrimmage against Texas.

National team career
Dugalić decided to represent the national team of her parents' homeland of Serbia. 

In June 2021, Dugalić was a member of the Serbian national team that won the gold medal at the Eurobasket 2021 in Valencia, Spain.

References

External links
 Angela Dugalić at FIBA

2001 births
Living people
American people of Serbian descent
American women's basketball players
Basketball players from Illinois
European champions for Serbia

Oregon Ducks women's basketball players
People from Des Plaines, Illinois
Power forwards (basketball)
Serbian expatriate basketball people in the United States
Serbian women's basketball players
Olympic basketball players of Serbia
Basketball players at the 2020 Summer Olympics

McDonald's High School All-Americans